The Grand Central Water Tower Midrand near Johannesburg in South Africa is an exceptional water tower, both considering its design as a concrete container in the shape of an inverted cone, and also considering the volume of the tower: 6500 m³. It was built in 1997 and is located near Grand Central Airport in Midrand.

Further reading 
 Christina Muwanga: South Africa: a guide to recent architecture. Ellipsis, London 1999, S. 216–217.

References 

Buildings and structures in Johannesburg
1990s architecture
Round towers
Water towers in South Africa